Ervin Parker (born August 19, 1958 in Georgetown, South Carolina) is a former American football linebacker who played in the NFL for the Buffalo Bills.  
He played his college ball at South Carolina State and was drafted in the fourth round by the Bills (the 93rd pick) in the 1980 NFL Draft.

References

1958 births
Living people
African-American people
American football linebackers
Buffalo Bills players
South Carolina State Bulldogs football players
Sportspeople from South Carolina
People from Georgetown, South Carolina